The Badminton Association of Indonesia or Persatuan Bulutangkis Seluruh Indonesia (sometimes translated as All Indonesia Badminton Association) is the governing body of badminton in Indonesia. It was founded on 5 May 1951. The PBSI joined the Badminton Asia Confederation in 1959 and later on also the Badminton World Federation. The Indonesian badminton is ranked 3rd in the world according to BWF's 2020 rankings. PBSI is also the governing body of the Indonesia national badminton team.

Tournaments
Indonesia Open, an annual open tournament that attracts the world's elite players.
Indonesia Masters
Indonesia Masters Super 100
Indonesia International Challenge
Indonesia International Series
Indonesian League

List of General Chairmen

References

Indon
Badminton in Indonesia
Badminton
1951 establishments in Indonesia